The 2009 Washington Huskies football team represented the University of Washington in the 2009 NCAA Division I FBS football season. The team's head coach was Steve Sarkisian, who replaced Tyrone Willingham following a winless 2008 season. The Huskies played their home games at Husky Stadium in Seattle, Washington. The Huskies finished the season 5–7 and 4–5 in Pac-10 play.

Schedule

Game summaries

LSU

LSU came into the game ranked #11 in the nation, but the Washington Huskies earned their respect after they gave up 478 total yards to Washington. The Washington Huskies had 13:44 time of possession edge and ran 83 offensive plays to LSU's 48, but lost the game due to a couple untimely turnovers and blown defensive plays.

Idaho

Washington ended the nation's longest losing streak at 15 games and gave new coach Steve Sarkisian his first victory, beating Idaho 42-23.  Sarkisian's first win as a head coach came as the Huskies scored touchdowns on its first five possessions—minus a fumble on the opening kickoff of the second half—making up for a defense that showed weakness against the pass. Locker tossed touchdowns of 24, 31 and 4 yards and added a 3-yard TD run of his own as Washington picked up its first victory since Nov. 17, 2007 when it beat California.

Despite the offensive performance, the Huskies defense showed it still has a long way to go in defending the pass. Quarterback Nathan Enderle threw for 279 yards—part of the 349 total passing yards by the Vandals. But Idaho had to settle for three field goals on three trips inside the Washington 20 in the first half.

Enderle then made his one crucial mistake on the first possession of the second half. After Washington's Curtis Shaw fumbled the second half kickoff and Idaho recovered, Enderle faced a third-and-4 at the Washington 25. Throwing toward the near sideline, Enderle's pass found the hands of linebacker Mason Foster, who returned the turnover 56 yards to the Idaho 21. Four plays later, and after Locker hit D'Andre Goodwin for 20 yards to the 1 on third down, Chris Polk plowed in for his first touchdown of the season.
The Vandals ended up out-gaining Washington 412 to 374, but were hampered by eight penalties and an inability to get Washington off the field

USC

The underdog Washington Huskies upset the USC Trojans on a last second field goal for a 16-13 win. The game snapped a 7-game winning streak for the Trojans over the Huskies, the last victory coming in 2001. For USC, Aaron Corp started for the injured Matt Barkley at quarterback.

The Huskies became the latest Pac-10 team to upset the Trojans, only two Pacific-10 Conference teams have failed to beat USC during the Pete Carroll era: Arizona and Arizona State. Other Pac-10 teams have defeated USC at least once during this period, Oregon State did it twice, 2006 and again in 2008.

Stanford

Notre Dame

Notre Dame defeats the Washington Huskies 37–30 at Notre Dame Stadium to give Notre Dame its 4th win of the season. Notre Dame stayed alive with 3 goal line stands resulting in only 3 Washington Husky points. Golden Tate was able to scorch Washington's defense for 244 yards receiving, 31 yards rushing and one touchdown. Notre Dame finally wins in OT and extends their record to 8–0 against the Huskies.

Arizona

Arizona State

With the appearance the game would be heading into overtime, ASU quarterback Danny Sullivan threw a 50-yard touchdown pass to receiver Chris McGaha in the last five seconds of the game.

Oregon

After Erik Folk's 33-yard field goal in the first quarter for Washington, Nate Costa rushed for 3 yards for a touchdown in the second quarter to give the Ducks their first lead. Then Javes Lewis intercepted Jake Locker's pass in the end zone to give Oregon the ball back, which resulted in Jeremiah Masoli scoring from the 1-yard line for their second touchdown. With a second left, Folk kicked a 48-yard field goal to end the half, which was aided by a personal foul on Oregon.

Unable to move, the Huskies turned the ball over to Oregon and the Ducks scored their third touchdown on Masoli's 3-yard run in the top of the third quarter.

UCLA

The Huskies failed to capitalize on UCLA's five turnovers and lost to the Bruins by a point at the Rose Bowl. Down by a point, Erik Folk's 38-yard field goal kick in the fourth quarter was no good. Folk kicked three field goals, two in the second quarter, and Jermaine Kearse scored two pass-touchdowns for the Huskies. Jake Locker completed 23 of 40 passes for 235 yards.

Kai Forbath kicked a 27-yard field goal earlier in the final period to win the game for the Bruins. Kevin Prince completed 13 of 17 passes for 212 yards and Kevin Craft had 10 of 14 completions for 159 yards. Both gave up an interception.

Oregon State

Washington State

California

Washington's upsets of #19 California becomes the eleventh FBS team since 1946 to follow a winless 2008 season with five victories.

Roster

Game Starters

% - started as second tight end ^ - started as third wide receiver

Rankings

Players in the NFL
The following UW Huskies were selected in the 2010 NFL Draft:

Award winners

Academics
Washington placed seven players on the 2009 Pac-10 All-Academic Team

DB Victor Aiyewa, Jr. 3.36 GPA in Sociology, First Team
RB Paul Homer, Sr. 3.19 GPA in Biology, Second Team
DB Greg Walker, RFr. 3.45 GPA in Pre-Engineering, Second Team
LB Cort Dennison, So. Honorable Mention
PK Erik Folk, So. Honorable Mention
OT Cody Habben, Jr. Honorable Mention
OG Morgan Rosborough,  Sr. Honorable Mention

Athletics
Washington placed ten players on the 2009 Pac-10 All-Conference Team

WR Jermaine Kearse, So., Second Team Offense
DL Daniel Te'o-Nesheim, Sr., Second Team Defense
LB Donald Butler, Sr., Second Team Defense
WR Devin Aguilar, So. Honorable Mention
OLB Mason Foster, Jr. Honorable Mention
OG Senio Kelemete, So. Honorable Mention
QB Jake Locker, Jr. Honorable Mention
TB Chris Polk, Fr. Honorable Mention
C Ryan Tolar, Jr. Honorable Mention
CB Desmond Trufant, Fr. Honorable Mention

References

Washington
Washington Huskies football seasons
Washington Huskies football